No True Scotsman, or appeal to purity, is an informal fallacy in which one attempts to protect their generalized statement from a falsifying counterexample by excluding the counterexample improperly. Rather than abandoning the falsified universal generalization or providing evidence that would disqualify the falsifying counterexample, a slightly modified generalization is constructed ad-hoc to definitionally exclude the undesirable specific case and similar counterexamples by appeal to rhetoric. This rhetoric takes the form of emotionally charged but nonsubstantive purity platitudes such as "true", "pure", "genuine", "authentic", "real", etc.

Philosophy professor Bradley Dowden explains the fallacy as an "ad hoc rescue" of a refuted generalization attempt. The following is a simplified rendition of the fallacy:

Person A: "No Scotsman puts sugar on his porridge."
Person B: "But my uncle Angus is a Scotsman and he puts sugar on his porridge."
Person A: "But no  Scotsman puts sugar on his porridge."

Occurrence
The “No True Scotsman” fallacy is committed when the arguer satisfies the following conditions: 
 not publicly retreating from the initial, falsified assertion
 offering a modified assertion that definitionally excludes a targeted unwanted counterexample
 using rhetoric to hide the modification

An appeal to purity is commonly associated with protecting a preferred group. Scottish national pride may be at stake if someone regularly considered to be Scottish commits a heinous crime. To protect people of Scottish heritage from a possible accusation of guilt by association, one may use this fallacy to deny that the group is associated with this undesirable member or action. "No  Scotsman would do something so undesirable"; i.e., the people who would do such a thing are tautologically (definitionally) excluded from being part of our group such that they cannot serve as a counterexample to the group's good nature.

Origin and other examples

The description of the fallacy in this form is attributed to British philosopher Antony Flew because the term originally appeared in Flew's 1971 book An Introduction to Western Philosophy. In his 1975 book Thinking About Thinking, he wrote:

In his 1966 book God & Philosophy, Flew described the "No-true-Scotsman Move":

The essayist David P. Goldman, writing under his pseudonym "Spengler", compared distinguishing between "mature" democracies, which never start wars, and "emerging democracies", which may start them, with the "no true Scotsman" fallacy. Spengler alleges that political scientists have attempted to save the "US academic dogma" that democracies never start wars against other democracies from counterexamples by declaring any democracy which does indeed start a war against another democracy to be flawed, thus maintaining that no  democracy starts a war against a fellow democracy.

Author Steven Pinker suggests phrases like "no true Christian ever kills, no true communist state is repressive and no true Trump supporter endorses violence" are explained by the no true Scotsman fallacy.

See also

Ad hoc hypothesis
Begging the question
Democrat In Name Only
Epistemic commitment
Equivocation
Gatekeeping
List of fallacies
Loaded language
Moving the goalposts
Persuasive definition
Reification (fallacy)
Republican In Name Only
Special pleading
Tautology (language)
True Pole

References

Verbal fallacies
1971 introductions